Mourad Souissi (born 7 July 1984) is an Algerian athlete who competes in the decathlon and occasionally in the pole vault. He is a multiple medalist at continental level.

Competition record

Personal bests
100 metres – 11.12 (-1.2) (Nairobi 2010)
400 metres – 47.64 (Nairobi 2010)
1500 metres – 4:35.40 (Bambous 2006)
110 metres hurdles – 14.51 (+1.3) (Arles 2009)
High jump – 1.94 (Bambous 2006)
Pole vault – 4.60 (Nairobi 2010)
Long jump – 7.22 (-1.1) (Nairobi 2010)
Shot put – 14.85 (Réduit 2011)
Discus throw – 41.94 (Arles 2009)
Javelin throw – 57.74 (Algiers 2007)
Decathlon – 7818 (Nairobi 2010)

External links
 IAAF profile

1984 births
Living people
Algerian decathletes
African Games silver medalists for Algeria
African Games medalists in athletics (track and field)
Athletes (track and field) at the 2007 All-Africa Games
Athletes (track and field) at the 2011 All-Africa Games
Islamic Solidarity Games medalists in athletics
Islamic Solidarity Games competitors for Algeria
21st-century Algerian people
20th-century Algerian people